is a global chemical and specialty materials company. The company was founded in 1935 in Yamaguchi Prefecture, as Toyo Soda Manufacturing Co., Ltd., and in 1987 changed its name to Tosoh Corporation. Today, its corporate headquarters are in Tokyo, Japan.

It began as a manufacturer of chlor-alkali and petrochemical commodities and feedstocks. Today it produces other kinds of products including electrolytic manganese dioxide (EMD), specialty polymers, fine chemicals, scientific instruments, and thin-film materials.

The Tosoh Group globally comprises more than 130 companies and includes manufacturing and marketing facilities in East Asia, Europe and the United States.

The company is listed on the first section of the Tokyo Stock Exchange and is a constituent of the Nikkei 225 stock index.

Tosoh's Nanyo complex has an annual vinyl chloride monomer production capacity of 1.2 million tonnes, the primary chemical intermediate of vinyl plastic.

Tosoh is a member of the Mizuho keiretsu.

Tosoh acquired  in 2006 and absorbed into Tosoh in 2014.

Business groups and products
Tosoh Corporation is divided into 13 business divisions that are organized into five groups: Petrochemical, Chlor-Alkali, Speciality, and Engineering. The fifth group is composed of support services, including logistics, construction, engineering support, and other support activities. Listed below are the five groups and their primary products:

 Petrochemical Group 
 Olefins: ethylene, propylene and polypropylene, tert-Butanol, and aromatics.
 Polymers: LDPE, LLDPE, HDPE, synthetic rubber, polychloroprene rubber, etc.
 Chlor-Alkali Group
 Basic Chemicals: calcium hypochlorite, sodium hydroxide, chlorinated paraffins, sodium bicarb, vinyl chloride monomer, and polyvinylchloride.
 Methylene diphenyl diisocyanate (MDI).
 Cement: Portland cement, blast-furnace slag cement, and fly ash cement.
 Specialty Group 
 Organic Chemicals: organic intermediates, ethyleneamines, flame retardants, polyurethane catalysts, benzyl alcohol, hydrocarbon based solvents, piperazine, sodium styrene sulfonate, and bromochloropropane(BCP).
 Advanced Materials: silica glass, sputtering deposition targets, zeolites, zirconia injection mold and grinding media, battery materials, and silica.
 Bio-science: automated immunoassay and glycohemoglobin analyzers, high-performance liquid chromatography (HPLC), molecular analyzers, chromatographic resins, size-exclusion chromatography instruments, laboratory automation solutions and services, and reagents.
The Specialty Group focuses on products for high-tech industries such as semiconductors, consumer electronics, pharmaceuticals, and healthcare.

 Engineering Group
 Water Treatment
 Other Services Group
 Analytical Services
 Information Technology
 Personnel Management
 Logistics

References

External links 

  

Chemical companies based in Tokyo
Companies listed on the Tokyo Stock Exchange
Chemical companies established in 1935
1935 establishments in Japan